Isidoro Pérez (born 5 March 1928) is a Spanish former freestyle swimmer. He competed in three events at the 1948 Summer Olympics.

References

External links
 

1928 births
Living people
Spanish male freestyle swimmers
Olympic swimmers of Spain
Swimmers at the 1948 Summer Olympics
Swimmers from Madrid